Cuthbert Edward Higgins (born 26 January 1945) is a Scottish former amateur footballer who played in the Scottish League for Queen's Park as an outside left. He was capped by Scotland at amateur level.

References 

Scottish footballers
Scottish Football League players
Queen's Park F.C. players
Association football outside forwards
Scotland amateur international footballers
1944 births
People from Dunoon
Living people
Sportspeople from Argyll and Bute